During the 1961–62 Italian football season, Calcio Padova competed in the Serie A.

Squad

Goalkeepers
  Bruno Bonollo
  Silvano Canton
  Antonio Pin

Defenders
  Giovanni Azzini
  Ivano Blason
  Cristiano Cervato
  Giampaolo Lampredi
  Luciano Piquè
  Aurelio Scagnellato

Midfielders
  Enrico Arienti
  Giancarlo Bacci
  Alberto Novelli
  Giorgio Barbolini
  Rino Bon
  Giovanni Caleffi
  Aldo Secco

Attackers
  Celestino Celio
  Giuseppe Cosma
  Dante Crippa
  Emanuele Del Vecchio
  Tomislav Kaloperović
  Rudolf Kölbl
  Mario Tortul
  Alberto Valsecchi

Competitions

Serie A

League table

Calcio Padova seasons
Calcio Padova